Michael Young may refer to:

Academics
 Michael Young (educationalist)
 Michael Young, Baron Young of Dartington (1915–2002), British life peer, sociologist and social activist 
 Michael K. Young (born 1949), former president of Texas A&M University
 Michael W. Young (born 1949), American geneticist and chronobiologist
 Mike Young (economist), Australian economist
 Mike Young (Royal Navy officer) (born 1967), British consultant and academic

Arts and entertainment
 Michael Young (actor) (born 1952), host of Diaries of a Xenophobe and How to Make Love to an Immigrant
 Michael Young (industrial designer) (born 1966), British product and furniture designer
 Mike Young (producer) (born 1945), TV producer and founder of Mike Young Productions
 Mike Young (game designer), American
 Mike Young (Misfits)
 Mike Young (Neighbours), soap opera character

Politics
 Michael Young, Baron Young of Dartington (1915–2002), British life peer, sociologist and social activist 
 Mike Young (agriculture official), American
 Michael Young (Canadian politician) (1934–2010), Canadian mayor of Victoria, British Columbia
 Mick Young (1936–1996), Australian House of Representatives
 R. Michael Young (born 1951), Indiana Senate
 Michael Young (businessman), executive who facilitated the political process which led to the end of apartheid in South Africa
 Michael Hughes-Young, 1st Baron St Helens (1912–1980), British army officer and politician

Sports

American football
 Mike Young (American football) (born 1962), American football wide receiver
Michael Young Jr. (born 1999), American football wide receiver

Baseball
 Mike Young (cricket) (born 1955), Australian cricket coach and baseball manager
 Mike Young (baseball) (born 1960), American baseball player
 Michael Young (baseball) (born 1976), American baseball player

Basketball
 Michael Young (basketball, born 1961), American basketball player
 Michael Young (basketball, born 1994), American basketball player
 Mike Young (basketball) (born 1963), American basketball coach

Rugby
 Michael Young (rugby league) (born 1984), Australian rugby league player
 Micky Young (born 1988), English rugby union player

Other sports
 Michael Young (bobsleigh) (born 1944), Canadian bobsledder
 Mike Young (cricket) (born 1955), Australian cricket coach and baseball manager
 Michael Young (Australian rules footballer) (1958–2018), Australian rules footballer
 Michael Young (judoka) (born 1958), Australian judoka

Other
 Michael W. Young (born 1937), British anthropologist
 Michael Young-Suk Oh (born 1971), Korean American evangelical